Imperial Hubris: Why the West is Losing the War on Terror (Brassey's, 2004) is a book originally published anonymously, but later revealed to have been authored by Michael Scheuer, a CIA veteran with 22 years service, who ran the Counterterrorist Center's bin Laden station from 1996 to 1999.

In his video of September 7th 2007, bin Laden says that "if you would like to get to know some of the reasons for your losing of your war against us, then read the book of Michael Scheuer in this regard."

Reviews
Reviews, ranging from high praise to scathing criticism, are presented here in chronological order.
Richard A. Clarke, Finally the CIA gets it right, The Washington Post, June 27, 2004
Michiko Kakutani, A Dark View of U.S. Strategy, The New York Times, July 9, 2004
Mark Follman, A spook speaks out, Salon Magazine, July 13, 2004
Faye Bowers, We have met the enemy and he is us, The Christian Science Monitor, July 13, 2004
Benjamin Schwarz, A Review, The Atlantic, August 10, 2004
James. H. Joyner, Jr., Book Review, Strategic Insights, vol. 3, no. 9, September 2004
Jason Burke, Why do they hate us?, The Guardian, September 4, 2004
Eric Margolis, Why West is losing, Toronto Sun, September 12, 2004
Jeff Helmreich, Empirical Hubris, Jerusalem Issue Brief, vol. 4, no. 4, September 13, 2004
David Frum, Uncertain Trumpet, National Review, November 16, 2004
Michael Scheuer, An author reviews the reviews of his book, lewrockwell.com,  February 7, 2005
Thomas Joscelyn, CIA Conspiracy Theorist, The Weekly Standard, February 16, 2005
Charles Glass, Cyber-Jihad, London Review of Books, vol. 28, no. 5, March 9, 2006

References

External links
Slate Advance excerpts.
Boston Phoenix article.
CNN article
Washington Journal interview with Scheuer on Imperial Hubris, November 24, 2004, C-SPAN

2004 non-fiction books
War on Terror books
Books about foreign relations of the United States
Books about imperialism
Current affairs books
Works published anonymously